André Dubosc (1866–1935) was a French stage and film actor.

Selected filmography
 The Conspiracy (1913)
 Happy Couple (1923)
 Lady Harrington (1926)
 The Crystal Submarine (1927)
 Prince Jean (1928)
 Tenderness (1930)
 Accused, Stand Up! (1930)
 His Highness Love (1931)
 The Brothers Karamazov (1931)
 Montmartre (1931)
 The Chocolate Girl (1932)
 If You Wish It (1932)
 The Woman Dressed As a Man (1932)
 Once Upon a Time (1933)
 A Love Story (1933)
 Koenigsmark (1935)
 Les yeux noirs (1935)

References

Bibliography
 Goble, Alan. The Complete Index to Literary Sources in Film. Walter de Gruyter, 1999.

External links

1866 births
1935 deaths
French male film actors
French male silent film actors
20th-century French male actors
French male stage actors
Male actors from Paris